The 1999–2000 Barys Astana season was the inaugural season of the franchise.

Kazakhstan Hockey Championship
Source: PassionHockey.com

Standings

First round

Final round

References

Barys Astana seasons
Barys
Barys